East Ambae (also known as Omba, Oba, Aoba, Walurigi, Lolovoli, Northeast Aoba, and Northeast Ambae) is an Oceanic language spoken on Ambae, Vanuatu.  The data in this article will concern itself with the Lolovoli dialect of the North-East Ambae language.

Phonology
North-East Ambae distinguishes 5 vowels and 16 consonants, shown in the tables below.

Morphosyntax

Pronominals
In Ambae there are four different pronominal forms, one set of free forms, independent pronouns and three sets of bound forms, subject proclitics, object enclitics and possessive suffixes.  All sets of pronominals distinguish between singular, dual and plural and between inclusive and exclusive in the first person.  Independent pronouns are preceded by the personal article when the head of a noun phrase.

Independent pronouns

Subject proclitics
The subject proclitic is the first part of a verb phrase and can attach to an aspect, mood, negative particle or verb head. Dual forms cliticise to the marker ru. In Lolovoli, no= is applied when cliticised in 1st person exclusive singular.

Object enclitics
Object enclitics occur when attached to the predicate head or last adverb in a verb phrase. These only occur in singular forms and all 3rd person forms.

Possessive suffixes
Possessive suffixes are attached to the head noun in a direct possessive construction, or a relational classifier in an indirect possessive construction.

Demonstratives 
In East Ambae, demonstratives are a part of the subclass of nominals. They can function pronominally as an independent pronoun at the head of a noun phrase, or they can modify the head noun in a noun phrase.

There are two forms which distinguish a proximal location from a distal location. The form ngaha ‘this’ refers to a proximal location, while ngihie ‘that’ refers to a distal location. While generally considered a conservative Oceanic language, in this way, East Ambae differs from many Oceanic languages, and the reconstructed Proto-Oceanic in that it only has two forms to represent locations. Most Oceanic languages, for example, Futuna-Aniwa, the Oceanic language also spoken on Vanuatu, have three forms, representing a near distance, a medium distance, and a far distance. East Ambae also differs from Proto-Oceanic by not only using demonstratives at the end of the noun phrase.

Ngihie also has a plural form, ngire, which is homophonous with the third person plural independent pronoun.

The form ngaha can also have a temporal meaning of ‘now’. This is shown in the example below.

The form ngihie can also function as an emphatic demonstrative, acting to modify an entire proposition.

Whether being used as the head of the noun phrase, or to modify the noun, the demonstratives take on the same form(s), ngaha and ngihie. This is typologically similar to other Oceanic languages, who often do not have different forms, either in the stem or in the inflection based on whether the demonstrative is acting as a noun or a modifier.

Demonstratives as the head noun 
Demonstratives, either in the form of the basic demonstratives ngaha ‘this’ (3) or ngihie ‘that’, or by a demonstrative derived from one of the members of the class of directionals prefixed with the demonstrative formative gi- or ngi- (5), can act as the head noun in a noun phrase, as shown in the examples given below.

Demonstratives as a modifier 
Demonstratives, either in the form of the basic demonstratives ngaha ‘this’ (6) or ngihie ‘that’ (7), or by a demonstrative derived from one of the members of the class of directionals prefixed with the demonstrative formative gi- or ngi- (8), can act to modify the head noun of a noun phrase.

When being used to modify the head noun, the order of noun and demonstratives in East Ambae is noun-demonstrative, which also occurs in all other languages in Vanuatu. This feature is common in almost all Oceanic languages.

Similarly to the reconstructed Proto-Oceanic, common nouns and independent pronouns can be modified by a demonstrative, while proper nouns and temporals cannot.

Demonstrative ge 
Additionally, the form ge can be used to indicate the location of an object. This form is generally used when someone has asked for the location of an object, and is accompanied by either pointing to the object in question, indication with the eyes, or tilting the head.

Presentative ia 
The presentative ia is used when presenting an object to the addressee. Ia is a borrowing from Bislama, an official language of Vanuatu, from the English ‘here’. *Ia is the reconstructed form for ‘here’ in Proto-Malayo-Polynesian. Ia can still be found in many Malayo-Polynesian languages, such as Lamaholot, Tongan, Samoan, Maori and Hawaiian. An example of this presentative ia is given below.

Demonstratives in spatial deixis 
Apart from the two forms ngaha and ngihie, all members of the subclass of absolute location nouns, as in directionals (vano ‘go along, over there’, hage ‘go up, up there’, and hivo ‘go down, down there’) and the small set of absolute location nouns, aulu 'up high, on top' vine 'down low' atagu 'behind, at the back' amue 'infront, at the front' aute 'up in the bush' alau 'down by the sea' varea 'outside' and vagahao 'far away', can form demonstratives to be used for spatial reference. When prefixed with the demonstrative formative prefix (DEM), gi-/ngi-, absolute location nouns, but not place names, can form demonstratives. There is no difference between these two forms, gi- and ngi-, and the choice between the two is arbitrary. Demonstratives formed from directional and absolute location nouns can have either a referential or modifying function.

Additionally, the suffixes -mai and -atu can be added to directionals. The suffix -mai is used to denote the object being closer to the speaker, while the suffix -atu is used to denote the object being closer to the addressee. Only the suffix -mai can be added to directionals that have formed demonstratives.

In example 10, where the prefix ngi- has been added to form a demonstrative, and the suffix -mai has been added, the demonstrative indicates that the object is closer to the speaker, while in example 11, where the demonstrative is unmarked and thus has no suffix, the meaning is that the object is farther away.

The suffix -atu cannot be added to demonstratives, thus example 12 is not grammatical.

Reduplication of demonstratives 
Reduplication is a common process in East Ambae, and demonstratives are able to be reduplicated. When directionals that have formed demonstratives are reduplicated, the purpose is to either indicate a greater distance away (as in the case of forms without the -mai suffix), shown in example 13, or a considerably closer distance to the speaker (in the case of forms with the -mai suffix), shown in example 14.

Negation 
In North-East Ambae negative construction formation differs depending on firstly, whether the unit is verbal or nonverbal, and then based on what clause structure is being employed. Instances of verbal negation are obligatorily a double negative construction, using preverbal and postverbal particles. Nonverbal structures are formed with a different particle, the placement of which varies depending on the other components in the structure.

Verbal negation 
Constructions of verbal negation in East Ambae are formed through a bipartite process, as there must be two specific negative particles present. The preverbal particle is ‘hi’, and the postverbal particle is ‘tea’. This is demonstrated in the example below. In these clauses, the subject marker is attached to the preverbal particle as a clitic. The subject proclitic attaches to the preverbal negative particles ‘hi’ (1) or to the irrealis particle ‘ni’ (2). Irrealis mood is how a speaker marks something as not known to have happened to them, as they are forming the utterance.

The word order of a negative verbal phrase is Verb Phrase → Subject = ni (hi) HEAD tea.

Neither the realis mood or telic aspect particles can be used within a negative verbal clause.

Verbal negative clauses in the past tense are formed by using an unmarked subject marker. Clauses with an unmarked subject marker express present or past reference to time, or instead, are indicative of the habitual aspect. Example 3 shows how the pronoun ‘ga’ combined with the negative preverbal particle ‘hi’ forms the past tense negative displayed in the sentence.

Nonverbal negation 
In nonverbal clauses, negative mood is expressed by the negative particle ‘hate’. ‘Hate’ can doubly function as a negative predicate that can only take a complement clause as its argument. There is no grammatical means to mark TAM (Tense, Aspect, Mood) in nonverbal clauses, therefore, tense may only be understood from the semantic context of the clause. Below is an example of a nonverbal negative clause.

Negative clause structure

Negative existential clauses 
To form a negative existential clause, the negative particle ‘hate’ is placed after the Noun Phrase. In order to investigate negative clause structure, it is important to contrast the formation process of affirmative clause structure. Minimally, a positive existential clause, contains a single constituent of the Noun Phrase, and this is a predicate. When this single Noun Phrase form is formed, the predication that follows is that referent in that Noun Phrase exists. In the corresponding negative existential clauses, what is predicated is that that referent of the subject Noun Phrase does not exist. It is worth noting that there are no existential verbs in East Ambae, and that all existential clauses are subsequently nonverbal.

Formation of the negative existential clause involves the Noun Phrase becoming the subject and the negative particle becoming the predicate. This is shown in the example below.

In positive existential clauses, modification of the head noun or a fronted topic must be present to construct these clauses. In contrast, for negative existential clauses, there is no clause initial topic slot and the subject Noun Phrase can be solely constituted by the head noun. This construction is demonstrated in the below example.

Negative possessive clauses 
Formation of a negative possessive clause necessitates that the negative particle ‘hate’ is after the relevant noun phrase. This form is very similar to that of the negative existential clause. Modification of the head noun has no bearing on the positioning of the topic clause, which remains in the initial position.

Negative equational clauses 
Formation of all negative equational clauses necessitates that the negative particle be placed between the subject and predicate noun phrases. This is demonstrated here:

In these examples, the negative particle 'hate' occurs before the subject noun phrases 'he/she is' and 'that child' respectively. There are two subtypes of equational clauses: classificatory and identificational. Classificatory clauses depict the class membership of an entity, example 7 is a negative classificatory equational clause as it posits the subject 's/he' in the class of bad swimmers. Identificational clauses are similar to classificatory ones but they also assert the identity of the object. Example 8 is an identificational negative equational clause, as it asserts the object's (my friend) identity (that child).

Negative equational clauses can have a subject noun phrase that is ellipsed within the clause. For example.

In the example, the subject noun phrase ‘a house’ is omitted in the clause.

If a speaker needs to indicate that an entity is pointedly not a member of a certain class, then the negative particle ‘hate’ can be used as a predicate and takes a complement clause headed by ‘vo’ (say). The English literal translation of ‘vo’ is “it is not that..” This alternate negative structure can also be used in some verbal clauses to express the same emphasis again. Below is an example of this alternative formation.

Negative prepositional clauses 
In the negative prepositional clause formation, the negative marker is placed before the prepositional phrase predicate and occurs after the subject noun phrase. For example:

Negative prepositional clauses are capable of a degree of ambiguity. This is due to negative prepositional clauses commonly having the same structure as existential clauses with prepositional phrase adjuncts. In the below example, it can be seen that the unmodified noun (tangaloi) can be placed as the subject noun phrase in an existential clause.

Negative Complement-taking Predicate (CTP) ‘hate’ 
A construction employed to signal that the event predicated in the complement clause does/did/will not happen is formed with the negative particle ‘hate’ preceding the particle ‘vo’. With ‘vo’ “introducing” the ‘hate’ particle.

This form alters the semantic layer of the negative clause form, conveying an additional pragmatic layer. It has an implication that the speaker would have expected the predication of the complement clause to be truthful, when it is not. The pragmatic layer in this construction is not found in other simple negative forms. ‘Hate’ then functions as a predicate that can take a complement of verbal or nonverbal clause, take a complement clause as its argument or act as the predicate to express that something does not exist through the noun phrase in a nonverbal existential clause. ‘Hate’ cannot be employed in a verb phrase that has been imbued with subject or aspect/mood, despite functioning as a predicate.

Example 13 is a verbal clause representing a predicate which will not happen, for instance: the speaker is not going to give the subject 'it' to the object/addressee 'you'. Example 14 is a nonverbal clause, also representing a predicate that does/did/will not happen.

Across the world's languages it is generally rare for there to be a negative predicate that can take a complement clause as its argument, but this is not uncommon amongst the Oceanic language family.

Possession 
East Ambae has four different possessive constructions, these are the distinctions between direct and indirect possession, and simplex and complex possession (Hyslop, 2001, p. 165).

If the possessor is marked on the possessed noun, this is a direct possessive construction,  whereas if the possessor is marked on a relational classifier rather than the possessee, this is an indirect possessive construction. Additionally, a simplex construction, where the possessor is pronominal, a possessive suffix occurs on the possessee or the relevant classifier, while a complex construction is one in which the possessor is represented by a nominal (Hyslop, 2001, p. 166).

The table below illustrates the four different possessive constructions.

According to Hyslop (2001, p. 167), while it is a morphosyntactic difference between direct and indirect possessive constructions, it is a semantically motivated distinction. In a direct possessive construction, nouns that function as the possessee can be said to be inalienably possessed, which refers to a permanent and inherent connection between the possessor and possessee that is indissoluble. Indirect possessive construction refers to alienable possession, a relationship between two referents of a less permanent and inherent type than inalienable possession, of an item that is to be 'possessed' in the conventional sense (Hyslop, 2001, p. 176).

Inalienable possession 
There are two distinct categories in East Ambae that nominals taking part in inalienable possession can belong to, these being those reflecting an intimate relationship to the possessor, and part-whole and positional relation expressions (Hyslop, 2001, p. 168). Those that reflect an intimate relationship to the possessor, the 'self' can be divided into four sub-categories: kin relations, body parts and associated body products, natural behaviour and personal attributes, and intimate personal property (Hyslop, 2001, p. 169). These sub categories are explored below.

The 'self'

Kin 
A direct possessive construction is used in all expressions of relationships between kin (Hyslop, 2001, p. 169).

Body parts and products 
Any body part of a person or animal is referred to using the direct possessive construction (Hyslop, 2001, p. 170).

In addition, any bodily features or fluids/secretions (such as tattoos and a person or animal's odour) that could be considered part of, or an extension of the body are inalienably possessed (Hyslop, 2001, p. 170).

Behaviour and personal attributes 
Natural behaviours, physical attributes, emotions, and mental processes (such as sleep, age, anger, and thought) enter into a direct possessive construction as personal attributes such as these are seen as an inalienable aspect of the concept of the self (Hyslop, 2001, p. 171).

Intimate personal property 
This class of objects can be possessed or 'owned' in the traditional sense, however, in the East Ambae culture, these objects are so closely associated with a person's existence that they are considered inalienable objects, and when referred to, it is using the direct possessive construction. These objects that are considered 'intimate' include things such as a person's pillow, as well as a person's clothes, which are seen as an extension of the body. This can also be said for an animal's cave or bird's nest (Hyslop, 2001, p. 172 & 173).

Part-whole and positional relations

Part-whole relations 
Part-whole relationships are expressed in a direct possessive construction as it is used to describe parts of objects and plants that are divisible into recognised parts in the same way as body part relations are expressed. The part is the 'possessed' head noun and the whole is the 'possessor' (Hyslop, 2001, p. 174).

This relationship is also used to refer to pieces of a whole. This is done by using the anticausativeised form of a verb, describing the way the object was divided, such as vise 'split', or kore 'break' (as seen in the examples below), and by taking the construct suffix, the form is marked as being a nominal (Hyslop, 2001, p. 175).

Positional relations 
Positional relations are a small subclass of bound relational location nouns and function as the possessee noun in a direct possessive construct, used to define the position of one object in relation to another, such as ulu- 'above' and mawiri- 'left, as shown below (Hyslop, 2001, p. 175).

Alienable possession 
Four different relational classifiers are used to express indirect possession, the use of a particular relational classifier is dependent on the possessive relationship between the possessed object and the possessor, rather than any characteristic of the possessee (Hyslop, 2001, p. 176).

The four relational classifiers are:
 ga- 'food possession'
 me- 'drink possession'
 bula- 'natural or valued object possession'
 no- 'general possession'

Relational classifier ga- 
This classifier indicates that the referent of the possessee noun is a food item. This can be used for any edible item including food that has already been eaten, food that has been prepared and ready to eat, unprepared or uncooked food, and so on. Usually, the ga- relational classifier is used only to refer to food that is ready to be eaten, so an animal yet to be slaughtered or plant yet to be harvested would be referred to using the bula- classifier (Hyslop, 2001, p. 177).

Only one relation expressed by ga- does not relate to food possession, and that is illness, despite perhaps expecting it to be categorised inalienably as a body part or product one can never describe one's illness using a direct possessive construct (Hyslop, 2001, p. 177).

Relational classifier me- 
This classifier indicates that the referent of the possessee noun is something for the possessor to drink, this can be the possession drinkable items such as ti 'tea' or wai 'water', as well as some plants classified as drinkable rather than edible, such as tovu 'sugarcane' and lamani 'lemon' and medicine, whether it is in liquid or tablet form as even then you swallow it with water (Hyslop, 2001, p. 178).

Relational classifier bula- 
The bula- classifier mainly refers to the relationship between 'natural entities' and their possessor, such as the ownership of crops and animals (Hyslop, 2001, p. 178).

This category has been broadened to include some items introduced by Europeans that could be said to have some lifelike characteristics (Hyslop, 2001, p. 179). An example of these items are listed below.
 redio 'radio'
 taragi 'car, automobile'
 hanwaj 'watch'
 tep 'tape recorder'
Another category includes items of adornment as they are not inalienably possessed as clothing is (Hyslop, 2001, p. 179). Examples include:
 iaring 'earrings'
 lala 'bracelet'

Relational classifier no- 
The no- classifier is considered a general classifier, or the default category, for a range of possessive relationships that are not related to any of the other categories of possessive relationships previously mentioned (Hyslop, 2001, p. 180) Possessive relationships included in this category are: traditional ownership of objects, activities such as work, the possessor's relationship with people who are not kin, and natural behaviours and mental processes that are not part of a direct possessive construction (Hyslop, 2001, p. 180).

Abbreviations

1NSG:first person, non-singular
2NSG:second person, non-singular
3NSG:third person, non-singular
DIR:deictic specifying direction towards addressee/past-future deictic centre
CONST:construct suffix
S:subject proclitic
O:object enclitic

FOOD:food possession
DRINK:drink possession

Source:

Footnotes

References

Dougherty, Janet W. D. (1983). West Futuna-Aniwa: An Introduction to a Polynesian Outlier Language. Berkeley: University of California Press. 

Terry., Crowley, (2013). The Oceanic Languages. Taylor and Francis. . OCLC 831119322.

External links
Database of audio recordings in Ambae East - basic Catholic prayers

Penama languages
Languages of Vanuatu